B. minutus may refer to:

 Batrachylodes minutus, a frog species endemic to Papua New Guinea
 Brycinus minutus, the dwarf lake turkana robber, a fish species endemic to Kenya

See also
 List of Latin and Greek words commonly used in systematic names#M